François Hotman (23 August 1524 – 12 February 1590) was a French Protestant lawyer and writer, associated with the legal humanists and with the monarchomaques, who struggled against absolute monarchy. His first name is often written 'Francis' in English.  His surname is Latinized by himself as Hotomanus, by others as Hotomannus and Hottomannus. He has been called "one of the first modern revolutionaries".

Biography 

He was born in Paris, the eldest son of Pierre Hotman (1485–1554), Seigneur de Villers-St-Paul, jure uxoris and Paule de Marle, heiress of the Seigneurie de Vaugien and Villers-St-Paul. His grandfather Lambert Hotman, a Silesian burgher, emigrating from Emmerich, (in the Duchy of Cleves), had left his native country to go to France with Engelbert, Count of Nevers. His father Pierre was a lawyer, practising at the Paris Bar.  Around the time of Francois' birth, Pierre was appointed to an official position in the Department of Woods and Forests (known as the 'Marble Table').  By this time, the Hotman family, that is, Pierre, his brothers and uncles, were one of the most important legal families in France.

Pierre, a zealous Catholic and a counsellor of the parlement of Paris, intended his son for the law, and sent him at the age of fifteen to the University of Orléans. He obtained his doctorate in three years, and returned to Paris. The work of a practising lawyer was not to his taste; he turned to jurisprudence and literature, and in 1546 was appointed lecturer in Roman Law at the University of Paris. The fortitude of Anne Dubourg under torture gained his adhesion to the cause of reform.

Giving up a career on which he had entered with high repute, he went in 1547 to Lyon. In the summer of 1548, at Bourges, he married Claude Aubelin (daughter of Guillaume Aubelin, Sieur de La Rivière and Françoise de Brachet). She and her father, like himself, were refugees. In October 1548 he moved to Geneva to be John Calvin's secretary. He went to Lausanne, and was elected to that university in February 1550. There, on the recommendation of Calvin, he was appointed professor of belles lettres and history. He was made a citizen of Geneva in 1553, his eldest child Jean was born there in 1552. On the invitation of the magistracy, he lectured at Strasbourg on law in October 1555, and became professor in June 1556, superseding François Baudouin, who had been his colleague in Paris. He was a member, from Strasbourg, to the Colloquy of Worms on 11 September 1557.

His fame was such that overtures were made to him by the courts of Prussia and Hesse, and by Elizabeth I of England. Twice he visited Germany, in 1556 accompanying Calvin to the Diet of Frankfurt. He was entrusted with confidential missions from the Huguenot leaders to German potentates, carrying at one time credentials from Catherine de' Medici. In 1560 he was one of the principal instigators of the Amboise conspiracy; in September of that year he was with Antoine of Navarre at Nérac. In 1562 he attached himself to Louis, prince of Condé. In 1564 he became professor of civil law at Valence, retrieving by his success the reputation of its university. In 1567 he succeeded Jacques Cujas in the chair of jurisprudence at Bourges.

Five months later his house and library were wrecked by a Catholic mob; he fled by Orléans to Paris, where Michel de l'Hôpital made him historiographer to king Charles IX. As agent for the Huguenots, he was sent to Blois to negotiate the peace of 1568. He returned to Bourges, but was driven away by the outbreak of hostilities. At Sancerre, during its siege, he composed his Consolatio (published in 1593). The peace of 1570 restored him to Bourges, whence a third time he fled the massacre of St Bartholomew (1572). In 1572 he left France forever with his family, in favour of Geneva. He there became professor of Roman law and published his 'Franco-Gallia' in 1573. On the approach of the duke of Savoy he removed to Basel in 1579. In 1580 he was appointed councillor of state to Henry of Navarre. The plague sent him in 1582 to Montbéliard, where his wife Claude died in 1583. Returning to Geneva in 1584 he developed a kind of scientific turn, dabbling in alchemy and the research for the philosopher's stone. He was admitted to the Privy Council of King Henry in December 1585. In 1589 he finally retired to Basel, where he died, leaving two sons and four daughters; he was buried in the cathedral.

Works 

Hotman was a home-loving and genuinely pious man (as his Consolatio shows). His constant removals were inspired less by fear for himself than for his family, and he had a constitutional desire for peace. He did much for 16th century jurisprudence, having a critical knowledge of Roman sources, and a fine Latin style. He broached the idea of a national code of French law. His works were very numerous, beginning with his De gradibus cognationis (1546), and including a treatise on the Eucharist (1566); a treatise (Anti-Tribonian, 1567) to show that French law could not be based on Justinian; a life of Coligny (1575); a polemic (Brutum fulmen, 1585) directed against a bull of Sixtus V, with many other works on law, history, politics, and classical learning.

His most important work, the Franco-Gallia (1573), found favour neither with Catholics nor with Huguenots in its day (except when it suited their purposes); yet its vogue has been compared to that obtained later by Jean-Jacques Rousseau's Contrat Social. It presented an Ideal of Protestant statesmanship, pleading for a representative government and an elective monarchy. It served the purpose of the Jesuits in their pamphlet war against Henry IV of France.

Family life
He had seven children by his wife:
 Jean Hotman, Marquis de Villers-St-Paul, Count de Hotman d 1634.  He married Renée de St-Martin, the former lady-in-waiting to Penelope Devereux, Lady Rich
 Theages d 1582
 Daniel, Prêtre de l'Oratoire d 1634
 Marie b 1558 Strausbourg
 Pierre b 1563, Counsellor to the King
 Suzanne married first to John Menteith of Scotland, and secondly to Antoine d'Ailleboust, counsellor to Henri II, Prince of Condé.  Their son Louis d'Ailleboust de Coulonge, was the governor of New France 1648-1651.
 Theodora m Jean Burquenon, Secretary of this same Prince of Condé.

Bibliography 

A recent reprint of the 1705 English translation of Franco-Gallia:

A modern English translation and the original Latin text of Franco-Gallia:

See also 
Monarchomaques

Footnotes

References

D.R. Kelley, François Hotman. A revolutionary's ordeal, Princeton 1983. 
Bayle, Dictionnaire
R Dareste, Essai sur F. Hotman (1850)
E Grégoire, in Nouvelle Biog. générale (1858)

External links
Genealogy of the Hotman family
 
 

1524 births
1590 deaths
French alchemists
16th-century French lawyers
French Calvinist and Reformed Christians
Huguenots
Monarchomachs
16th-century French writers
16th-century male writers
16th-century alchemists